Jabal Bura is a granite mountain located in Bura east of Bajil, Yemen. The area is under consideration for inscription in UNESCO's list of sites that have "outstanding universal value."

World Heritage status 
This site was added to the UNESCO World Heritage Tentative List on 08/07/2002, in the mixed (cultural and natural) category.

Site description 

The west side of the mountain is covered with a type of dense tropical vegetation that makes access difficult. The east face of the mountain is covered with many hamlets, and unique cultivated terraces that reach the summit. The population has its special customs, and dresses differently from other people in other regions. Bura is still very well protected. However, a road on the east side is currently being expanded and paved. Consequently, an increased number of vehicles could threaten the balance of the area's biodiversity. Mountain communities isolated from many modern communications media preserve their peculiarities. The east side of the mountain is tentatively listed as a Cultural Heritage site (by UNESCO), while the west side is tentatively listed under the Natural Heritage category. Five ecological levels of vegetation show climatic differences along 2,000 meters, with bananas at growing at the foot of Jabal, and durum wheat at the top. This diverse ecology allows for the growth of various species of trees (30) and shrubs (40), of live and wild animals (10), reptiles (12), and a considerable number of endemic (+ 50) and migratory (30) birds etc. Several threats to the biodiversity exist: a lack of income jeopardizes the population's ability to protect their environment, and therefore the inhabitants cut down trees and shrubs to use as firewood. The construction of the new road across fragile landscapes to the summit will put pressure on the ecological balance and make access to the forest much easier, contributing to deforestation and allowing livestock to the graze the land. Recent legislation proposes to conserve the biodiversity by establishing a consortium with farmers and landowners. The legislation, approved by Parliament, will take action for development. Bura will be declared a "protected area", and the entire population is expected to receive economic benefits: a paved road, a health center, two schools, a greater distribution of water and electricity, loans, and beekeeping training for national and international tourists. This biodiversity is open to scientists of all disciplines and eco-tourism at the national and international levels.

Notes

References 
 Training course & workshop on Jabal Bura’a - Yemen Times Accessed 24-02-2009.
 prados.html
 McLaughlin, D. (2008). Yemen: The Bradt Travel Guide. Bradt Travel Guides. P. 166. , 

Geography of Yemen
Mountains of Yemen
World Heritage Tentative List